Christian Andrew Carr Rowan (born 5 October 1972) is an Australian politician and specialist physician. He has been the Liberal National Party State Member for Moggill in the Queensland Legislative Assembly since 2015.

Professional career 
Rowan is a specialist physician in addiction medicine and medical administration.

Rowan served as President of the Rural Doctors Association of Queensland (RDAQ) from 2006 to 2007, and served as President of the Australian Medical Association of Queensland (AMAQ) from 2013 to 2014. Rowan was awarded an Australian College of Rural and Remote Medicine Distinguished Service Award in 2010.

Rowan was previously the Deputy Chief Medical Officer for Uniting Care Health and Director of Medical Services at St Andrew's War Memorial Hospital. He has also worked as a Director of Medical Services and Medical Superintendent in rural and regional Queensland, predominantly in South-West Queensland but also on the Darling Downs.

Rowan has also advocated about the growing public health problems of over-the-counter codeine misuse and the emergence of new synthetic drugs.

Political career 
Rowan was first elected to the Queensland Parliament on 31 January 2015 in the seat of Moggill at the Queensland State Election defeating the then Labor candidate Louisa Pink with 58.2 per cent of the two-party preferred vote after preferences. He was a Deputy Chair of the Health, Communities, Disability Services and Domestic and Family Violence Prevention Committee in the 55th Queensland Parliament.

In 2014, Rowan was sidelined as a spokesman for the AMAQ after he informed doctors he supported the Newman LNP Government's public hospital contracts. Rowan said the contracts had the "capacity to drive productivity, efficiency, value for money and enhance transparency of outcomes for the public hospital system." The AMA federal president Steve Hambleton replaced Rowan as spokesman for the Queensland campaign to force the State LNP Government to continue negotiating with doctors over dispute resolution procedures, transfers, and dismissal procedures. Rudd reaffirmed that the Queensland division of the association fully supported the doctors' stance on the contracts. 

Rowan in his maiden speech to the Queensland Parliament said "The sustainability of our health system requires productivity, efficiency, accountability, transparency and the ongoing measurement and public reporting of the effectiveness of government investment. Unfortunately, often in health-care individuals and sectional interest groups pursue conflicted agendas related to power, profit and prestige with little regard to the interests of patients, despite the public protestations of those individuals and sectional interest groups to the contrary. That was evident during the recent public sector medical contracts dispute in Queensland."

Early life and education 
Rowan was born in Brisbane, Australia. He completed his secondary education at the Anglican Church Grammar School in East Brisbane. He received his Bachelor of Medicine and Bachelor of Surgery from The University of Queensland in 1996. He attained a Master of Diplomacy & Trade from Monash University in 2002.

References

External links 
 

1972 births
Living people
Members of the Queensland Legislative Assembly
Liberal National Party of Queensland politicians
21st-century Australian politicians